Spencer Street is a major street and thoroughfare in the central business district of Melbourne, Victoria. The street was gazetted in 1837 as the westernmost boundary of the Hoddle Grid.

Spencer Street is named for John Spencer, 3rd Earl Spencer, former Chancellor of the Exchequer under Lord Melbourne, Prime Minister of the United Kingdom.

Location 
Running roughly north–south, Spencer Street forms the western edge of the original Hoddle Grid. To the north Spencer Street becomes Dynon Road, whilst to the south it becomes Clarendon Street after crossing the Spencer Street Bridge over the Yarra River.

Spencer Street denotes the boundary between Melbourne and Docklands to the west, West Melbourne in the north and Southbank in the south, near Batman Park.

History 
Spencer Street was the site of the first permanent buildings in the settlement now called Melbourne. The home of John Batman was built on nearby Batman's Hill where he lived until his death and the early camps of Captain William Lonsdale and Charles La Trobe were located along the street.

With the creation of Melbourne Docklands in 2000, the construction of Southern Cross railway station in 2006 and the addition of a shopping centre, the area has undergone significant urban renewal.

Notable buildings

Many buildings and structures on Spencer Street are listed on the Victorian Heritage Register and/or classified by the National Trust of Australia. Others are more modern and significant for their current or future function. These include:

Heritage Listed 
 Grand Hotel and Grand Central Apartments (the former Victorian Railway Offices)
 Former Mail Exchange
 Overhead Water Tank (part of the former Spencer Street Power Station, demolished 2008)
 History of Transport Mural by artist Harold Freeman (at Southern Cross railway station)
 Sands and McDougall's Warehouse

Other Buildings 
 Southern Cross station (formerly Spencer Street station), 
 The Age newspaper offices 
 Former Charles Hotham hotel 
 HM Melbourne Assessment Prison

Under Construction 
Several apartment buildings and hotels are currently under construction, including the Ritz-Carlton which will be Australia's tallest hotel when completed.

Victoria's largest police station, the City West Police Centre, is located on Spencer Street. The Victoria Police Centre is set to open adjacent to it on Spencer Street as the new headquarters for Victoria Police in 2020.

Transport 
Spencer Street is served primarily by the Southern Cross railway station and is both a major terminus for V/Line regional passenger trains and a major stop for metropolitan trains. The street is served by tram routes 11, 12, 35, 96 and 109 at its southern end and 30, 75 and 86 towards the north.

Ghost sightings
There have been reports of supposed sightings of the ghost of John Spencer, 3rd Earl Spencer roaming around the corner of Francis Street and Spencer Street. This local attraction has brought ghost hunters from around Australia to investigate the phenomena, and is a common stop for local ghost tours.

See also

References

Streets in Melbourne
Streets in Melbourne City Centre